The Shakespeare Tavern is an Elizabethan playhouse located in downtown Atlanta, Georgia, United States. Starting productions at Manuel's Tavern in Atlanta in 1984, the Tavern moved to 499 Peachtree Street in 1990. 

The Shakespeare Tavern is home to the Atlanta Shakespeare Company, the first Shakespearean company in the United States to have performed at Shakespeare's Globe in London, England. The Shakespeare Tavern specializes in a theatrical approach called original practice, which focuses on presenting the authentic aesthetics of the Elizabethan era.

History of the Atlanta Shakespeare Company

1984 to 1990
The Atlanta Shakespeare Company was started on May 16, 1984 It all began with a performance of As You Like It at Manuel's Tavern on North Highland Avenue. Over a period of six years, The Atlanta Shakespeare Company produced Romeo and Juliet, Much Ado about Nothing, A Midsummer Night's Dream, The Merchant of Venice, Twelfth Night, The Two Gentlemen of Verona, and The Taming of the Shrew in the back room at Manuel's, and at the nearby Excelsior Mill, attracting national attention with articles in The Wall Street Journal, The New York Times, and coverage by CBS and CNN.

1990 to 1999
In 1990, The Atlanta Shakespeare Company opened the Shakespeare Tavern at 499 Peachtree Street. Since the Tavern opened, The Atlanta Shakespeare Company has produced over 73 plays, presenting 1,600 plus performances, including more than 30 Shakespeare titles and over 18 period classics by the likes of Aristophanes, Shaw,  Aphra Behn, Jean Racine, Christopher Marlowe, Jean Anouilh, Ryūnosuke Akutagawa, Niccolò Machiavelli, Albert Camus, Jean Genet, Tennessee Williams, Molière, Bertolt Brecht, Jean Cocteau, and Thornton Wilder. In 1995, The Atlanta Shakespeare Company was the first American company to perform on the stage of Shakespeare's Globe in London, England.

1999 to present
After a $1.6 million renovation and expansion, The Atlanta Shakespeare Company re-opened The Shakespeare Tavern Playhouse on October 15, 1999. Complete with a Globe-inspired balcony, the renovated Tavern created an even more active Elizabethan actor/audience dynamic. In spring 2006, after completing a $500,000 renovation, The Atlanta Shakespeare Company revealed a Globe-inspired façade, further adding to the Elizabethan feel of the Tavern.

In 2004, The Shakespeare Tavern was listed as a Major Festival in the book Shakespeare Festivals Around the World by Marcus D. Gregio (Editor).

In spring 2011, the Atlanta Shakespeare Company became the first American company to complete the Shakespearean Canon with a production of Edward III, though the play's authorship is disputed. Following the completion of the canon, they put on a satirical production of Double Falsehood.

With the opening of Henry VIII on June 2nd, 2019, the Shakespeare Tavern completed the Shakespearean canon for the second time.

Company aesthetics
The Atlanta Shakespeare Company has adopted a theatrical approach known as original practice. The intent of specializing in this approach is to recreate each play’s original production aesthetics. Since the Atlanta Shakespeare Company usually stages the plays of Shakespeare and his contemporaries, original practice means that the aesthetics that are mimicked are those of the Elizabethan era. The Atlanta Shakespeare Company has adopted original practice as a means to bring authenticity to a modern audience. Its commitment to the aesthetic has meant that costumes used in plays are usually hand-made period costumes, all music and sound effects are live, and actors often directly engage and say their lines to the audience.

Accolades
The Fulton County Board of Commissioners declared December 16, 1998 as Atlanta Shakespeare Company Day.

Additional programs
The Atlanta Shakespeare Company offers education programs that provide opportunities for students to practice acting and stagecraft. All programs are led and taught by professional educational artists, most of whom also serve as members of the professional Tavern acting company.

Shakespeare Intensive for Teens
Beginning in 2006, the Shakespeare Tavern began offering the Summer Shakespeare Intensive for Teens, also referred to as SIT. Since 2008, there have been two month-long sessions offered. This program is for rising 9th graders to rising college freshman. In the program, students are immersed in a professional-style training program. The experience culminates in one to three performances of a full-length Shakespeare play on the professional Tavern stage. Four years must pass between repeats of shows.

Productions

For the summer of 2020, SIT was moved to an online format in response to the COVID-19 pandemic Performances were conducted over Zoom (software).

References

External links

 The Shakespeare Tavern Playhouse website
 National Endowment for the Arts Shakespeare in American Communities Article
 The Shakespeare Tavern on "Atlanta Sounds"

1990 establishments in Georgia (U.S. state)
Theatres completed in 1990
Shakespearean theatre companies
Theatre in Atlanta
Theatres in Atlanta